Constituency WR-16 is a reserved seat for women in the Khyber Pakhtunkhwa Assembly.

2013
Sobia Shahid

See also
 Constituency PK-94 (Lower Dir-I)
 Constituency PK-95 (Lower Dir-II)
 Constituency PK-96 (Lower Dir-III)
 Constituency PK-97 (Lower Dir-IV)

References

Khyber Pakhtunkhwa Assembly constituencies